Cycleptus is a genus of freshwater fish containing two relatively large North American species of suckers. They are endemic to river basins draining into the Gulf of Mexico, including the Mississippi, Rio Grande and others in the United States and Mexico.

Species
 Cycleptus elongatus (Lesueur, 1817) (Blue sucker)
 Cycleptus meridionalis Burr & Mayden, 1999 (Southeastern blue sucker)

References
 
 
 NatureServe - Cycleptus elongatus

Catostomidae
Taxa named by Constantine Samuel Rafinesque